The Kidnapping of Fux the Banker is a 1923 Czech silent comedy film directed by Karl Anton. The film was inspired by the slapstick comedies about the Keystone Cops. Fashion designer Paul Poiret played himself. Only an incomplete 61 minutes long version of the film survived.

Cast
 Adi Berger as Banker C. W. Fux
 Anny Ondra as Fux's daughter Daisy
 Karel Lamač as Tom Darey
 Bronislava Livia as Maud Gould
 Eman Fiala as Sherlock Holmes II
 Emilie Nitschová as Daisy's tutor
 Karel Fiala as Butler Karel
 Theodor Pištěk as Duke of Pommery
 Saša Rašilov as Police chief
 Paul Poiret as Fashion designer from Paris
 Jan W. Speerger as Burglar
 Přemysl Pražský as Director of the asylum

References

External links 
 

1923 films
Czechoslovak comedy films
Czech silent films
Czech comedy films
1923 comedy films
Films directed by Karl Anton
Czech black-and-white films
Silent comedy films